The Otley Brewing Company Limited, colloquially Otley Brewery, is a brewery located in Pontypridd, Wales. Established in 2005, it has won several awards, including the Champion Beer of Wales in 2006. The head brewer is Charlie Otley. In October 2016, the brewery was put up for sale by its owners. In February 2018 the brewery ceased trading.

Background
The Otley family owns and operates three pubs in the Pontypridd area; a natural synergy was perceived in establishing a brewing operation. Some trials on the homebrewing scale, when the recipe for O-riginal was developed, led to limited production at Moor Beer Company in Somerset; a full-scale five barrel brewplant was purchased from Moor and production on an industrial estate in Pontypridd began in August 2005.

Beer is currently available in casks regularly at the Otley-owned pubs in Pontypridd and  Trefforest and as guest ales in other pubs in the Rhondda valley and Cardiff areas. They also produce bottled versions of Dark O, O1, O2 and O-Garden.  20 litre (36 pints) polypins and 10 litre (18 pints) minipins are also available for most of their beers.

Beers
Otley beers generally have floral/citrus hop flavours, making heavy use of American hop varieties, particularly Amarillo hops; and display a dry finish on drinking. Otley's beers often do not fit closely into the beer style scheme generally applied to British beer.

O1 is the most common beer available, a golden ale at 4.0% ABV. While classed as a pale ale by the brewery, CAMRA's categorization scheme treats it as a golden ale.

By the same token, Otley O8,  the current Champion Beer of Wales, is classified as a barleywine under CAMRA beer style definitions, and as such stood unopposed in its category at the Champion Beer of Wales tasting; but the beer is formulated as a strong golden ale.

Awards
Otley Brewing Company has won several awards for its beer since its establishment, and won five medals at CAMRA's Great Welsh Beer and Cider Festival in August 2006, the first year of its eligibility for the awards.

2005
 South Devon CAMRA festival: OG, silver medal in strong ale category

2006
 SIBA West beer competition: Dark-O, bronze medal in stouts and milds

2006-2007
 Great Welsh Beer & Cider Festival:
 O8: Overall, Champion Beer of Wales 2006-07
 OG: Third place, Champion Beer of Wales
 O8: Gold medal, Barleywine category
 OG: Gold medal, Strong ale category
 O1: Gold medal, Golden ale category

2007
 Great British Beer Festival: O1, Third place, Champion Golden Ale of Britain

2008
 Great Welsh Beer & Cider Festival:
 O8: Overall, Champion Beer of Wales 2008-09
 OG: Runner-up, Strong Bitter category
 O-Garden: Winner, Specialty Beer category
 Great British Beer Festival:
 O1, First place, Champion Golden Ale of Britain
 O-Garden, First Place, Speciality Ale of Britain

References

External links
 Otley Brewing Company official site

Breweries in Wales
Pontypridd
Food and drink companies established in 2005
British companies established in 2005